The Lee–Hamblin family is a political family rooted in the American West.  It is intertwined closely with the Udall family, and most, though not all the notable Lees are also Udall descendants.  John D. Lee is also a direct descendant of Richard Lee II of the Lee family of Virginia.

J. David Lee (1851–1922), a son of John D. Lee, had two wives.  His notable descendants all come through his second wife Inez Hamblin, who was a daughter of Jacob Hamblin. Together they have the distinction of having four great-grandchildren as U.S. senators from four different U.S. states. 

One exception was Ettie Lee of Los Angeles who was Californina Teacher of the year and U.S. Teacher of the year in the 60's and she donated $19 million to homes for delinquent boys on her death (Ettie Lee Homes). Her mother was Evaline Dorinda Clark.  

Grandchildren:
Morris K. Udall, U.S. Representative for Arizona and 1976 U.S. Presidential candidate
Stewart Udall, U.S. Representative for Arizona and U.S. Secretary of the Interior
Rex E. Lee, U.S. Solicitor General

Great-grandchildren:
Mike Lee, U.S. Senator for Utah
Thomas R. Lee, Associate Chief Justice, Utah Supreme Court
Gordon H. Smith, U.S. Senator for Oregon
Mark Udall, U.S. Senator for Colorado
Tom Udall, U.S. Senator for New Mexico
Milan Smith, Jr., Federal Judge, U.S. 9th Circuit

References

 Some Descendants of John Doyle Lee Compiled by Lorraine (Richardson) Manderscheid, Published in 2000
 Politicalgraveyard.com "Udall family of Arizona"

Latter Day Saint families
Political families of the United States
Lee family of Virginia